Panorama Village is a city in Montgomery County, Texas, United States.

Residents have Conroe, Texas addresses and Willis, Texas phone numbers. The small city is home to a 27-hole municipal golf course and country club. The population was 2,515 at the 2020 census.

Geography

Panorama Village is located at  (30.378484, –95.496284).

History 
The Bamwood Development Company purchased the land which would become Panorama Village in 1964. The company constructed a golf course with residential subdivisions surrounding it. A civic association was formed in 1969, with residents purchasing the Panorama Golf Club. The city incorporated in 1972.

Demographics

As of the 2020 United States census, there were 2,515 people, 1,123 households, and 791 families residing in the city.

As of the 2010 United States Census, there were 2,170 people, 1,001 households, and 691 families residing in the city. The racial makeup of the city was 96.4% White, 1.1% African American, 0.2% Native American, 0.6% Asian, 0.6% from other races, and 1.1% from two or more races. Hispanic or Latino of any race were 5.6% of the population.

There were 1,001 households, out of which 16.2% had children under the age of 18 living with them, 57.7% were married couples living together, 8.3% had a female householder with no husband present, and 31.0% were non-families. 27.8% of all households were made up of individuals. The average household size was 2.17 and the average family size was 2.60.

In the city, the population was spread out, with 14.8% under the age of 18, 4.9% from 18 to 24, 15.5% from 25 to 44, 33.3% from 45 to 64, and 31.4% who were 65 years of age or older. The median age was 55.6 years. For every 100 females, there were 84.4 males. For every 100 females age 18 and over, there were 81.4 males.

According to the 2015 American Community Survey, The median income for a household in the city was $61,250 and the median income for a family was $67,137. Males had a median income of $47,708 versus $26,935 for females. The per capita income for the city was $38,199. About 4.6% of families and 6.4% of the population were below the poverty line, including 6.4% of those under age 18 and 3.8% of those age 65 or over.

Government
Panorama Village is governed locally by a mayor and five member city council. The current mayor is Lynn Scott. Ted Nichols, a council member, also serves as mayor pro tempore. The other council members are Royce Engler, Clint Fowler, Joe Watson, and Doug McEntire.

In the Texas State Senate, Panorama Village is part of District 4, represented by Republican Brandon Creighton. In the Texas House of Representatives, Panorama Village is part of District 16, represented by Republican Will Metcalf.

In the United States Senate, Republicans John Cornyn and Ted Cruz represent the entire state of Texas. In the United States House of Representatives, Panorama Village is part of District 8, represented by Republican Kevin Brady.

Education
Panorama Village is within the Willis Independent School District.

Panorama Village zoned to Turner Elementary School, Brabham Middle School, and Willis High School.

Residents of Willis ISD (and therefore Panorama Village) are served by the Lone Star College System (formerly North Harris Montgomery Community College).

References

Cities in Montgomery County, Texas
Cities in Texas
Greater Houston